Ancoracysta twista is a eukaryotic microorganism. It is a predatory protist that appears to be sister to Haptista.

Description
Ancoracysta twista was first described in November 2017 in Current Biology. It was found in a sample collected from the surface of a tropical aquarium brain coral. It actively feeds on Procryptobia sorokini, probably immobilising its prey through discharging a previously unknown type of extrusome named an ancoracyst.

Genetic analysis shows that it is not closely related to any known lineage, but it may be most closely related to a grouping of haptophytes and centrohelids (Haptista). It is notable for having a gene-rich mitochondrial genome, the largest known outside the jakobids or Diphylleia rotans. Uniquely, it appears to contain both the nucleus-encoded holocytochrome c synthase system III and the mitochondrion-encoded bacterial cytochrome c maturation system I.

Taxonomy
A 2018 study from Cavalier-Smith, Chao & Lewis created a new subphylum and subsequent lower taxonomic ranks for Ancoracysta twista. They also created a new combination for Colponema marisrubri (Mylnikov & Tikhonenkov, 2009), which was shown to be ultrastructurally similar and phylogenetically close to A. twista, thus renaming it A. marisrubri.

A 2022 study placed A. twista in a new supergroup Provora.

References

External links 
 
 Katarina Zimmer; Denis Tikhonenkov (image): A Newly Identified Species Represents Its Own Eukaryotic Lineage — The 10-micrometer-long flagellate cell might have a big story to tell about the evolution of eukaryotes. On: The Scientist. Nov 20, 2017

Protists described in 2017
Diaphoretickes